Butch Cassidy and the Sundance Kid is a 1969 American Western buddy film directed by George Roy Hill and written by William Goldman. Based loosely on fact, the film tells the story of Wild West outlaws Robert LeRoy Parker, known as Butch Cassidy (Paul Newman), and his partner Harry Longabaugh, the "Sundance Kid" (Robert Redford), who are on the run from a crack US posse after a string of train robberies. The pair and Sundance's lover, Etta Place (Katharine Ross), flee to Bolivia to escape the posse.

In 2003, the film was selected for preservation in the United States National Film Registry by the Library of Congress as being "culturally, historically, or aesthetically significant." The American Film Institute ranked Butch Cassidy and the Sundance Kid as the 73rd-greatest American film on its "AFI's 100 Years...100 Movies (10th Anniversary Edition)" list, and number 50 on the original list. Butch Cassidy and the Sundance Kid were ranked 20th-greatest heroes on "AFI's 100 Years...100 Heroes & Villains". Butch Cassidy and the Sundance Kid was selected by the American Film Institute as the 7th-greatest Western of all time in the AFI's 10 Top 10 list in 2008.

Plot

In 1899 Wyoming, Butch Cassidy is the affable, clever, talkative leader of the outlaw Hole-in-the-Wall Gang. His closest companion is the laconic dead-shot "Sundance Kid". The two return to their hideout at Hole-in-the-Wall (Wyoming) to discover that the rest of the gang, irked at Cassidy's long absences, have selected Harvey Logan as their new leader.

Logan challenges Cassidy to a knife fight over the gang's leadership. Cassidy defeats him using trickery, but embraces Logan's idea to rob the Union Pacific Overland Flyer train on both its eastward and westward runs, agreeing that the second robbery would be unexpected and likely reap even more money than the first.

The first robbery goes well. To celebrate, Cassidy visits a favorite brothel in a nearby town and watches, amused, as the town marshal unsuccessfully attempts to organize a posse to track down the gang, only to have his address to the townsfolk hijacked by a friendly bicycle salesman (he calls it "the future"). Sundance visits his lover, schoolteacher Etta Place, and they spend the night together. Cassidy joins up with them early the next morning, and takes Place for a ride on his new bike.

On the second train robbery, Cassidy uses too much dynamite to blow open the safe, which is much larger than the safe on the previous job. The explosion demolishes the baggage car in the process and the money flies everywhere. As the gang scrambles to gather up the money, a second train arrives carrying a six-man team of lawmen. The crack squad doggedly pursues Cassidy and Sundance, who try various ruses to get away, all of which fail. They try to hide out in the brothel, and then to seek amnesty from the friendly Sheriff Bledsoe, but he tells them their days are numbered and all they can do is flee.

As the posse remains in pursuit, despite all attempts to elude them, Cassidy and Sundance determine that the group includes renowned Indian tracker "Lord Baltimore" and relentless lawman Joe Lefors, recognizable by his white skimmer. They finally elude their pursuers by jumping from a cliff into a river far below. They learn from Place that the posse has been paid by Union Pacific head E. H. Harriman to remain on their trail until they are both killed.

Cassidy convinces Sundance and Place that the three should go to Bolivia, which he envisions as a robber's paradise. On their arrival there, Sundance is dismayed by the living conditions and regards the country with contempt, but Cassidy remains optimistic. They discover that they know too little Spanish to pull off a bank robbery, so Place attempts to teach them the language. However, their confidence drops when they see a man wearing a white hat (the signature of determined lawman Lefors) and fear that Harriman's posse is still after them.

Cassidy suggests "going straight", and he and Sundance land their first honest job as payroll guards for a mining company. However, they are ambushed by local bandits on their first run and their boss, Percy Garris, is killed. They kill the bandits, the first time Cassidy has ever shot someone. Place recommends farming or ranching as other lines of work, but they conclude the straight life isn't for them. Sensing they will be killed should they return to robbery, Place decides to go back to the United States.

Cassidy and Sundance steal a payroll and a burro used to carry it, and arrive in a small town. A boy recognizes the burro's livestock branding and alerts the local police, leading to a gunfight with the outlaws. Cassidy has to make a desperate run to the burro to get ammunition, while Sundance provides covering fire. Wounded, the two men take cover inside a nearby building. Cassidy suggests the duo's next destination should be Australia. Meanwhile, unbeknownst to the two of them, the local police have called on the Bolivian Army to deal with the two outlaws. Confident of their ability to escape, the pair charge out of the building, guns blazing, directly into a hail of bullets from the massed troops who have occupied all of the surrounding vantage points. The film ends on a freeze-frame, as sounds of the Bolivian troops firing on the doomed outlaws are heard, turns to a yellow and black picture and the credits are shown.

Cast

Production

Screenplay
William Goldman first came across the story of Butch Cassidy in the late 1950s and researched intermittently for eight years before starting to write the screenplay. Goldman says he wrote the story as an original screenplay because he did not want to do the research to make it as authentic as a novel. Goldman later stated:
The whole reason I wrote the ... thing, there is that famous line that Scott Fitzgerald wrote, who was one of my heroes, "There are no second acts in American lives." When I read about Cassidy and Longabaugh and the superposse coming after them—that's phenomenal material. They ran to South America and lived there for eight years and that was what thrilled me: they had a second act. They were more legendary in South America than they had been in the old West ... It's a great story. Those two guys and that pretty girl going down to South America and all that stuff. It just seems to me it's a wonderful piece of material.

The characters' flight to South America caused one executive to reject the script, as it was then unusual in Western films for the protagonists to flee.

Development
According to Goldman, when he first wrote the script and sent it out for consideration, only one studio wanted to buy it—and that was with the proviso that the two lead characters did not flee to South America. When Goldman protested that that was what had happened, the studio head responded, "I don't give a shit. All I know is John Wayne don't run away."

Goldman rewrote the script, "didn't change it more than a few pages, and subsequently found that every studio wanted it."

The role of Sundance was offered to Jack Lemmon, whose production company, JML, had produced the film Cool Hand Luke (1967) starring Newman. Lemmon, however, turned down the role because he did not like riding horses and felt that he had already played too many aspects of the Sundance Kid's character before. Other actors considered for the role of Sundance were Steve McQueen and Warren Beatty, who both turned it down, with Beatty claiming that the film was too similar to Bonnie and Clyde. According to Goldman, McQueen and Newman both read the scripts at the same time and agreed to do the film. McQueen eventually backed out of the film due to disagreements with Newman. The two actors would eventually team up in the 1974 disaster film The Towering Inferno. Jacqueline Bisset was a top contender for the role of Etta Place.

Filming locations include the ghost town of Grafton, Zion National Park, Snow Canyon State Park, and the city of St. George. These areas remain popular film tourism destinations, including the Cassidy Trail in Reds Canyon.

Burt Bacharach and Hal David wrote the song "Raindrops Keep Fallin' on My Head" for the film. Some felt the song was the wrong tone for a western, but George Roy Hill insisted on its inclusion. Robert Redford, one of the stars of the films, was among those who disapproved of using the song, though he later acknowledged he was wrong:

Soundtrack

Personnel
Marvin Stamm − trumpet
Pete Jolly − piano
Hubert Laws − flute
Bob Bain, Bill Pitman − guitar
Tommy Tedesco − ukelele
Carol Kaye − electric bass
Emil Richards − percussion

Release

Premieres
The world premiere of the film was on September 23, 1969, at the Roger Sherman Theater, in New Haven, Connecticut. The premiere was attended by Paul Newman, his wife Joanne Woodward, Robert Redford, George Roy Hill, William Goldman, and John Foreman, among others. It opened the next day in New York City at the Penthouse and Sutton theatres.

Home media
The film became available on DVD on May 16, 2000, in a Special Edition that is also available on VHS.

Reception

Box office
The film grossed $82,625 in its opening week from two theatres in New York City. The following week it expanded and became the number one film in the United States and Canada for two weeks. It went on to earn $15 million in theatrical rentals in the United States and Canada by the end of 1969. According to Fox records the film required $13,850,000 in rentals to break even and by December 11, 1970, had made $36,825,000 so made a considerable profit to the studio. It eventually returned $45,953,000 in rentals.

With a final US gross of over $100 million, it was the top-grossing film released in 1969.

It was the eighth-most-popular film of 1970 in France.

Critical response

At the time of release, reviewers gave the film mediocre grades, and New York and national reviews were "mixed to terrible" though better elsewhere, screenwriter William Goldman recalled in his book Which Lie Did I Tell?: More Adventures in the Screen Trade.

New York Times film reviewer Vincent Canby wrote that the film is "very funny in a strictly contemporary way," but said that "at the heart of the film there is a gnawing emptiness that can't be satisfied by an awareness that Hill and Goldman knew exactly what they were doing---making a very slick movie." He described the "Raindrops" sequence as part of an effort to "play tricks on the audience" by "taking short cuts to lyricism. " The  performers, Canby wrote, "succeed although the movie does not."

Time magazine said the film's two male stars are "afflicted with cinematic schizophrenia. One moment they are sinewy, battered remnants of a discarded tradition. The next, they are low comedians whose chaffing relationship—and dialogue—could have been lifted from a Batman and Robin episode."  Time criticized the "Raindrops" sequence and the "scat-singing sound track by Burt Bacharach at his most cacophonous," which it said made the film "absurd and anachronistic."

Roger Ebert's review of the movie was a mixed 2.5 out of 4 stars. He praised the beginning of the film and its three lead actors, but felt the film progressed too slowly and had an unsatisfactory ending. But after Harriman hires his posse, Ebert thought the movie's quality declined: "Hill apparently spent a lot of money to take his company on location for these scenes, and I guess when he got back to Hollywood he couldn't bear to edit them out of the final version. So the Super-posse chases our heroes unceasingly, until we've long since forgotten how well the movie started.”

Accolades

The film is recognized by American Film Institute in these lists:
 2008 – AFI's 10 Top 10: Western – #7

Legacy

Over time, major American movie reviewers have been widely favorable. Rotten Tomatoes gives the film an 88% approval rating based on 52 reviews and an average score of 8.3/10. The site's critical consensus reads: "With its iconic pairing of Paul Newman and Robert Redford, jaunty screenplay and Burt Bacharach score, Butch Cassidy and the Sundance Kid has gone down as among the defining moments in late-'60s American cinema."

The Writers Guild of America ranked the screenplay #11 on its list of 101 Greatest Screenplays ever written. The film inspired the television series Alias Smith and Jones, starring Pete Duel and Ben Murphy as outlaws trying to earn an amnesty.

A parody titled "Botch Casually and the Somedunce Kid" was published in Mad. It was illustrated by Mort Drucker and written by Arnie Kogen in issue No. 136, July 1970.

In 1979 Butch and Sundance: The Early Days, a prequel, was released starring Tom Berenger as Butch Cassidy and William Katt as the Sundance Kid. It was directed by Richard Lester and written by Allan Burns. William Goldman, the writer of the original film, was an executive producer. Jeff Corey was the only actor to appear in the original and the prequel.

Television adaptation
In September 2022, Amazon Studios announced a television adaptation of the film, starring Regé-Jean Page and Glen Powell. Joe and Anthony Russo will be executive producers under their AGBO production banner.

See also 
 List of American films of 1969
 Antihero (Cassidy and Sundance are considered "antiheroes".)

References

Bibliography

External links

 
 
 
 
 Ten Things You Didn't Know About Butch Cassidy and the Sundance Kid  from the American Movie Classics "Future of Classic" blog
 Butch Cassidy and the Sundance Kid at Virtual History
 Butch Cassidy and the Sundance Kid essay by Daniel Eagan in America's Film Legacy: The Authoritative Guide to the Landmark Movies in the National Film Registry, A&C Black, 2010 , pages 654–655 

1969 films
1969 Western (genre) films
1960s buddy films
20th Century Fox films
American Western (genre) films
American buddy action films
Best Film BAFTA Award winners
Cultural depictions of Butch Cassidy and the Sundance Kid
Duos
1960s English-language films
Estudios Churubusco films
Films about bank robbery
Films about outlaws
Films about train robbery
Films directed by George Roy Hill
Films produced by John Foreman (producer)
Films scored by Burt Bacharach
Films set in Bolivia
Films set in Wyoming
Films set in the 1890s
Films shot in Colorado
Films shot in Mexico
Films shot in New Mexico
Films shot in Utah
Films that won the Best Original Score Academy Award
Films that won the Best Original Song Academy Award
Films whose cinematographer won the Best Cinematography Academy Award
Films whose director won the Best Direction BAFTA Award
Films whose writer won the Best Original Screenplay Academy Award
Films whose writer won the Best Screenplay BAFTA Award
Films with screenplays by William Goldman
Revisionist Western (genre) films
United States National Film Registry films
1960s American films